Pherenicus was an epic poet from Heraclea Pontica. He treated of Metamorphoses and similar fabulous tales. Athenaeus gives a statement from him respecting the origin of the fig-tree and other trees; and Tzetzes speaks of him as one of those who treated of the monstrous and fabulous forms of men, and quotes from him two lines respecting the Hyperboreans.

References

Ancient Pontic Greeks
Ancient Greek epic poets
People from Bithynia